Rahasyam is a 1969 Indian Malayalam film, directed by J. Sasikumar and produced by K. P. Kottarakkara. The film stars Prem Nazir, Sheela, Jayabharathi and Adoor Bhasi in the lead roles. The film had musical score by B. A. Chidambaranath.

Cast

Prem Nazir as Babu & CID K. K. Nair (Double Role)
Sheela as Ammini
Jayabharathi as Sulochana
Adoor Bhasi as Shankaran
Jose Prakash as Damodaran
C. R. Lakshmi
Friend Ramaswamy
K. P. Ummer as Prasad
Leela
Meena as Mrs. Shyamala Thambi
N. Govindankutty as Dance Master Govindankutty
Paravoor Bharathan as Vikraman

Soundtrack
The music was composed by B. A. Chidambaranath and the lyrics were written by Sreekumaran Thampi.

References

External links
 

1969 films
1960s Malayalam-language films
Films directed by J. Sasikumar